Peel Island is an island of the Andaman Islands.  It belongs to the South Andaman administrative district, part of the Indian union territory of the Andaman and Nicobar Islands.

Etymology
The island is named after Captain Sir William Peel of the Royal Navy, who died in the Indian Rebellion of 1857.

Geography
The island is part of the Ritchie's Archipelago Group and is located between Nicholson Island and John Lawrence Island.

Administration
Politically, Peel Island is part of Port Blair Taluk.

Demographics 
The island is uninhabited.

Image gallery

References 

Ritchie's Archipelago
Islands of South Andaman district
Islands of the Andaman Sea
Uninhabited islands of India
Islands of India
Islands of the Bay of Bengal